Ngarla is a Pama–Nyungan language of coastal Western Australia. It is possibly mutually intelligible with Panyjima and Martuthunira, but the three are considered distinct languages.

Ngarla is a member of the Ngayarda branch of the Pama–Nyungan languages. Dench (1995) believed there was insufficient data to enable it to be confidently classified, but Bowern & Koch (2004) include it without proviso.

Ngarla is spoken near Port Hedland. The "Ngarla" on the Ashburton River is a dialect of a different, though possibly related, language, Yinhawangka.

According to the Irra Wangga Language Centre, "Ngarla is no longer spoken today, although there remain some community members who know some words and phrases in the language".

Phonology

Consonants

Vowels

The long vowels are rare.

Grammar

Tense markers

Ngarla tense markers for verbs:

Language revival

, Ngarla is one of 20 languages prioritised as part of the Priority Languages Support Project, being undertaken by First Languages Australia and funded by the Department of Communications and the Arts. The project aims to "identify and document critically-endangered languages — those languages for which little or no documentation exists, where no recordings have previously been made, but where there are living speakers".

Research has been undertaken on the language at the Irra Wangga Language Centre, who have produced resources in Ngarla, including Ngarla Numbers and Jamie’s Bush Tucker Trip.

Notes

References

External links
 Wangka Maya

Ngarla
Endangered indigenous Australian languages in Western Australia
Extinct languages